Krumbach is a market town in southern Lower Austria, Austria.  It is part of the landscape Bucklige Welt.

History

Archaeological artifacts from the Stone Age, the Bronze Age and the Roman times have been found in the area.  In 1182, Krumbach was mentioned for the first time in writing. The present castle Schloss Krumbach was erected in the 13th century. In 1394 Hans von Chrumbach, the last Lord of Krumbach, died and left the castle to his maternal uncle.

In the 17th and 18th centuries, the plague and the cholera affected Krumbach. In 1854, it became a market town. In 1884, Krumbach opened a fire station. It has a post office, a school (Volksschule Krumbach), a high school (Hauptschule Krumbach) and a church.

Mayors since 1945

Coat of arms
The coat of arms shows a silver lion with a chain around its neck. The crest is colored red. This has been the town's seal since January 19, 1957.

Sites of interest

Buildings:
Schloss Krumbach
Museumsdorf Krumbach
Parks:
Abrahampark
Holzerpark

References

Bucklige Welt
Cities and towns in Wiener Neustadt-Land District